Scranton School District (SSD) is a school district in Scranton, Arkansas. The school district provides education in prekindergarten through grade 12 for more than 400 students and employs more than 70 educators and staff for its two schools and district offices. SSD encompasses  of land in Logan County. The district includes all of Scranton, all of Morrison Bluff, and most of Subiaco.

The district and school mascot and athletic emblem is the Rocket, with purple and gold serving as the school colors.

Schools 
 Scranton High School, serving grades 7 through 12.
 Scranton Elementary School, serving prekindergarten through grade 6.

Scranton High School is nationally recognized as a bronze medalist in the Best High Schools Report 2012 evaluated by U.S. News & World Report.

References

External links
 

Education in Logan County, Arkansas
School districts in Arkansas